Galvanic urticaria has been described after exposure to a galvanic (electrical) device used to treat hyperhidrosis.

See also
 Urticaria
 Skin lesion

References

 
Urticaria and angioedema